George Hanosh (January 7, 1938 – December 7, 2008) was an American politician and businessman who served as a member of the New Mexico House of Representatives from 1998 to 2008.

Early life and education 
Hanosh was born in Albuquerque, New Mexico. He graduated from New Mexico Highlands University.

Career 
After earning his bachelor's degree, Hanosh moved to Grants, New Mexico and became a car salesman and General Motors dealership owner. He eventually served as the chair of the New Mexico Automobile Dealers Association. Hanosh was a member of the New Mexico House of Representatives from 1998 to 2008. He did not seek re-election in 2008 due to an illness.

Personal life 
Hanosh and his wife, Barbara, had eight children. He died in Grants, New Mexico on December 7, 2008. Hanosh is the namesake of George Hanosh Blvd. in Grants.

References 

1938 births
2008 deaths
New Mexico Highlands University alumni
People from Grants, New Mexico
Members of the New Mexico House of Representatives
People from Bernalillo County, New Mexico
People from Cibola County, New Mexico
Politicians from Albuquerque, New Mexico
Businesspeople from New Mexico
20th-century American politicians
21st-century American politicians